The Will is a 2020 American romance film. It was based on the 2014 novel of the same name by Kristen Ashley.

Premise
Josie attends the funeral of her grandmother. She discovers she has been "left" in her grandmother's will to the enigmatic Jake.

"Early in her life, Josephine Malone learned the hard way that there was only one person she could love and trust: her grandmother, Lydia Malone. Out of necessity, unconsciously and very successfully, Josephine donned a disguise to keep all others at bay. She led a globetrotting lifestyle on the fringes of the fashion and music elite, but she kept herself distant. While Josephine was trotting the globe, retired boxer Jake Spear was living in the same small town as Lydia. There was nothing disguised about Jake. Including the fact he made a habit of making very bad decisions about whom to give his love. But for Josephine and Jake, there was one person who adored them. One person who knew how to lead them to happiness. And one person who was intent on doing it. Even if she had to do it as her final wish on this earth."

Cast
Megan Dodds as Josephine "Josie" Malone
Chris McKenna as Jake Spear
Christian Hopper as Connor Spear
Caroline Mixon as Amber Spear
Trey Murphy as Ethan Spear
Patrick Byas as Amond
Martin Dingle-Wall as Henry Gagnon
Billy Rick as Boston Stone
Robin Spear as Alyssa
David Anthony Buglione as Junior

Production
Passionflix optioned the novel in 2017.

References

External links

The Will at Letterbox 

2020 films
2020s English-language films